Raúl Olivo (6 June 1921 – 17 January 2018) was a Venezuelan sports shooter. He competed in the trap event at the 1956 Summer Olympics.

References

1921 births
2018 deaths
Venezuelan male sport shooters
Olympic shooters of Venezuela
Shooters at the 1956 Summer Olympics
Place of birth missing